Keredari is a village in the Keredari CD block in the  Hazaribagh Sadar subdivision of the Hazaribagh district in the Indian state of Jharkhand.

Geography

Location

Area overview
Hazaribagh district is a plateau area and forests occupy around about 45% of the total area. It is a predominantly rural area with 92.34% of the population living in rural areas against 7.66% in the urban areas. There are many census towns in the district, as can be seen in the map alongside. Agriculture is the main occupation of the people but with the extension of coal mines, particularly in the southern part of the district, employment in coal mines is increasing. However, it has to be borne in mind that modern mining operations are highly mechanised. Four operational areas of Central Coalfields are marked on the map. All these areas are spread across partly this district and partly the neighbouring districts.

Note: The map alongside presents some of the notable locations in the district. All places marked in the map are linked in the larger full screen map. Urbanisation data calculated on the basis of census data for CD blocks and may vary a little against unpublished official data.

Civic administration

Police station
Keredari police station serves the Keredari CD block.

CD block HQ
The headquarters of Keredari CD block are located at Keredari.

Demographics
According to the 2011 Census of India, Keredari had a total population of 3,693, of which 1,912 (52%) were males and 1,781 (48%) were females. Population in the age range 0-6 years was 653. The total number of literate persons in Keredari was 1,850 (60.86% of the population over 6 years).

Economy
As of 2020, as per a newspaper report, Central Coalfields has initiated steps for acquisition of 3331.50 acres of land in 7 villages (6 in Keredari CD block in Hazaribagh district and 1 in Tandwa CD block in Chatra district) for the Chandragupta open cast project in the Amrapali & Chandragupta Area of CCL. The announcement is being made in the villages with the beating of drums. Quoting company officials, the report says that the area has reserves of 600 million tonnes of coal, and annual production target for Chandragupta OCP is 20 million tonnes.

Transport
State Highway 7 passes through Keredari.

References

Villages in Hazaribagh district